Torno (also known as Aparecida) is a parish in the municipality of Lousada, Portugal. The population in 2011 was 2,542, in an area of 3.75 km2.

Situated in the Eastern part of the municipality, Torno is limited in the south by Vilar do Torno e Alentém, in the west by Cernadelo, in the southeast by municipality of Amarante and in the north by municipality of Felgueiras.

References

Freguesias of Lousada